Belmont is a town in Middlesex County, Massachusetts, United States. It is a western suburb of Boston, Massachusetts, United States; and is part of the Greater Boston metropolitan area. At the time of the 2020 U.S. Census, the town's population stood at 27,295, up 10.4% from 2010.

History

Belmont was established on March 18, 1859, by former citizens of, and land from the bordering towns of Watertown, to the south; Waltham, to the west; and Arlington, then known as West Cambridge, to the north. They also wanted a town where no one could buy or sell alcohol (alcohol is now legal to purchase in Belmont). The town was named after Bellmont, the 200 acre (0.8 km2) estate of the largest donor to its creation, John Perkins Cushing. Cushing Square is named after him and what was left of his estate after it nearly burned to the ground became a Belmont Public Library branch. The easternmost section of the town, including the western portion of Fresh Pond, was annexed by Cambridge in 1880 in a dispute over a slaughterhouse licensed in 1878 on Fresh Pond, so that Cambridge could protect Fresh Pond, a part of its municipal water system.

Preceding its incorporation, Belmont was an agrarian based town, with several large farms servicing Boston for produce and livestock. It remained largely the same until the turn of the twentieth century, when trolley service and better roads were introduced, making the town more attractive as a residential area, most notably for the building of large estates. Belmont's population grew by over 70 percent during the 1920s.

The economics of the town shifted from purely agrarian to a commercial greenhouse base; much of the flower and vegetable needs of Boston were met from the Belmont 'hothouses' which persisted until about 1983 when Edgar's, the last large greenhouse firm in the area, closed.

Other commercial enterprises in Belmont included mining clay and waste management. The reclamation of a large dump and quarry off Concord Avenue into sites for the Belmont High School and the Clay Pit Pond stands as a lasting example of environmental planning. With the introduction of automobiles and highways, Belmont continued its transition to a commuter-based suburb throughout the twentieth century.

Belmont was the home of the headquarters of the John Birch Society from the organization's founding in 1958 until its relocation to Appleton, Wisconsin in 1989. The building at 395 Concord Avenue later became the headquarters of the National Association for Armenian Studies and Research (NAASR), which is expanding and renovating its facility .

Railroad history

Belmont was once served by two railroads, the Fitchburg Railroad and the Central Massachusetts Railroad, both of which were later to become part of the Boston & Maine Railroad system. Originally the two railroads each had their own separate trackage through town, but in 1952 the Central Mass tracks were removed between Hill's Crossing and Clematis Brook (Waltham), and rail traffic was rerouted over the Fitchburg line.

Today the MBTA owns the trackage that runs through Belmont, which is known as the Fitchburg Line. Passenger service on this line currently terminates at Fitchburg, but it once was the area's main route into New York state. , the MBTA was planning to extend future service to West Fitchburg.

The station stops at Belmont Center and Waverley were once grade crossings, so that pedestrian and vehicular traffic had to cross directly over rails that were in public roads. In 1907, the grade at Belmont Center was eliminated by constructing a stone arch bridge and elevated embankment to carry the tracks past a new station building. At Waverley, the grade was lowered so that the tracks ran under Trapelo Road, though the platform did not have an enclosed structure at that location.

A second historic railroad station building exists in Belmont, though it is not obvious. The one-room Wellington Hill Station was originally built in the 1840s as a private school, not far from its current location in Belmont Center. It was then used by the Fitchburg Railroad from 1852 to 1879. When the railroad decided to replace the station with a larger structure, the building was moved to the Underwood Estate and used as a summer house.  In 1974, the station was donated to the Belmont Historical Society. It was restored and relocated to its current location in 1980.

Present day
Belmont remains a primarily residential suburb, with little population growth since the 1950s. It is best known for the mansion-filled Belmont Hill neighborhood, although most residents live in more densely settled, low-lying areas around the Hill. There are three major commercial centers in the town: Belmont Center in the center, Cushing Square in the south, and Waverley Square in the west. Town Hall and other civic buildings are located in Belmont Center. Large tracts of land from former farms and greenhouse estates form public or publicly accessible areas such as Rock Meadow, Habitat, portions of the McLean Hospital tract and various town fields.

Geography

According to the United States Census Bureau, the town has a total area of 4.7 square miles (12.2 km2), of which 4.7 square miles (12.1 km2) is land and less than 0.1 square miles (0.1 km2), or 1.06%, is water.

Belmont is bordered by Cambridge on the east, Arlington on the north, Lexington on the northwest, Waltham on the west, and Watertown on the south.

Environmental concerns
In 2002, Middlesex County was ranked in the worst 10% of polluted counties in the United States in terms of air and water pollution. Two companies that ranked in the top 10 for polluters in the county were Polaroid Corporation in Waltham and the Cambridge Plating Company in Belmont, which is located several hundred feet from Belmont High School. Now operated by Purecoat North LLC, the Cambridge Plating Company was fined by the Environmental Protection Agency in 2002 following various violations and in 2004 following a fire that led to an accumulation of toxic wastewater.

The chemicals released were trichloroethylene and dichloromethane, both of which are harmful and have been shown to cause cancer. These chemicals are released into the air so it is difficult to trace them and to determine the source as there are also several other industries in the area that release the same pollutants.

Climate

In a typical year, Belmont, Massachusetts temperatures fall below 50F° for 195 days per year. Annual precipitation in Belmont is typically 45.2 inches per year (high in the US) and snow covers the ground 52 days per year or 14.2% of the year (high in the US). It may be helpful to understand the yearly precipitation by imagining 9 straight days of moderate rain per year. The humidity is below 60% for approximately 25.4 days or 7% of the year.

Demographics

, there were 27,295 residents of the Town of Belmont, and in 2021 there were 17,640 registered voters. In 2020, the racial make up of the town was 69.6% White, 1.9% Black or African American, 0.05% Native American, 18.5% Asian, and 4.7% from two or more races. Hispanic or Latino of any race were 4.7% of the population. Pending the release of the 2020 Census results, in 2010 6.3% of the population were under the age of five, 24.6% were under the age of eighteen, and 15.8% were 65 years of age or older; 53% were female. The median household income was $114,141.

The 2000 census listed 9,732 households, out of which 31.0% had children under the age of 18 living with them, 54.9% were married couples living together, 8.8% had a female householder with no husband present, and 33.7% were non-families. 25.9% of all households were made up of individuals, and 11.9% had someone living alone who was 65 years of age or older. The average household size was 2.45 and the average family size was 3.01.

In 2010, 20% of the residents of Belmont were born outside of the United States. In 2000 this percentage was 15%.

Belmont has been referred to as a "Mormon enclave" due to the location of the Boston Massachusetts Temple of the LDS Church at the highest elevation in the town. The prominent gold statue of the Angel Moroni atop the Temple was originally designed by Cyrus Dallin in nearby Arlington, Massachusetts.

Points of interest
 Redtop, home of William Dean Howells
 Edwin O. Reischauer Memorial House
 Boston & Maine Railroad Station, now known as the MBTA Commuter Rail Belmont stop, now owned by the Lions Club
 Boston Massachusetts Temple of the LDS Church
 William Flagg Homer House

Government
The executive branch of the town government consists of a three-person Select Board elected by the residents. The Select Board appoints a Town Administrator who is in charge of daily operations.

The legislative branch is a representative town meeting, with eight districts each electing 36 representatives, plus ex-officio members and a Town Moderator to run the annual meeting.

Belmont is part of the 24th Middlesex District (for the Massachusetts House of Representatives), the 2nd Middlesex and Suffolk District (for the Massachusetts Senate), and Massachusetts's 5th congressional district (for the United States House of Representatives).

Education

Belmont is served by the Belmont Public Schools, governed by an independently elected school committee.

There are four public elementary schools in Belmont, the Mary Lee Burbank, Daniel Butler, Winn Brook, and Roger Wellington school. The Mary Lee Burbank School was founded in 1931. Two other public elementary schools, Payson Park and Kendall, were closed in the 1970s and 1980s, respectively. The former closed after being destroyed by fire, the latter closed due to population shifts and was converted to an arts center, which was later also destroyed by fire. There is one public middle school, the Winthrop L. Chenery Middle School, which was rebuilt on the same location after an electrical fire damaged the auditorium in 1995, and one public high school, Belmont High School. On May 28, 2019 a groundbreaking ceremony was held for the construction of a new middle and high school which will be co-located on the same site.

Belmont High is noted for its college placement, strong athletics, academics, music, and theater arts; a typical class size of about 320 students. Belmont High regularly feeds 5-10 students into Harvard University on an average given year. , U.S. News & World Report gave Belmont High School a gold medal and named it the 100th best public high school in the United States and the second best in the state of Massachusetts (after Boston Latin School).

Belmont Hill School is a private, non-sectarian high school, grades 7–12.  Belmont Day School is a private, non-sectarian Pre-K–8 school. There are several smaller private schools.

Media
The Belmont Citizen-Herald is a weekly newspaper covering Belmont, and published on Thursdays, and is available online, as well. The Citizen-Herald was formed in 1988 by merging the Belmont Citizen (founded in 1920) and the Belmont Herald (founded in 1930). The Boston Globe and Boston.com publish a Belmont Your Town website that provides local news and information. The Belmontonian is an independently operated hyper-local news website. Belmont Patch also provides online local news.

The Belmont Media Center (BMC) was founded in 2005 as a local non-profit, public-educational & government access TV station mandated to provide and make available to Belmont residents a variety of media production & editing classes, locally produced TV programming, and video/TV equipment, studios and facilities. In 2017, BMC programs are available to Belmont subscribers of Comcast and Verizon, and BMC also carries live programming. and on-demand programs

Infrastructure

Transportation

Roads
Major roads in the town are Concord Avenue, which bisects the town from east to west; Common Street and Pleasant Street (Route 60) which travel north-south through Belmont; and Trapelo Road and Belmont Street, which run along the southern edge of the town.

Belmont is served directly by two state route designated highways. Running close to the middle of town is Route 60, locally known as Pleasant Street. On the northern border, Route 2 generally outlines Belmont's boundary with the neighboring town of Arlington. Despite the small size of the town, Belmont has 5 signed exits on Route 2. Nearby major highways include I-95/MA-Route 128, Route 16, Route 3, and Route 20.

Public transit
Belmont is served by the Massachusetts Bay Transportation Authority's Fitchburg Commuter Rail line, and its bus and trackless trolley lines.

Two MBTA Commuter Rail rail stations, Waverley and Belmont Center, are located in the town. Belmont is roughly 16 minutes away from the rail line's terminus at North Station, Boston.

Nearby in Cambridge lies Alewife Station, the western terminus of the Red Line; providing a connection to Boston and the entire metropolitan rapid transit system.

Health care
McLean Hospital, a psychiatric hospital and research center located in Belmont. It is the setting of the novel Girl, Interrupted, which was made into a 1999 movie.

Notable people

Due to its proximity to Harvard and MIT universities, amongst others, Belmont has had several Nobel Prize winners in residence at one time or another.  Notable past and present residents include people in the following categories:

Business

 John Perkins Cushing, China trader 
 Stephen P. Mugar, founder of the Star Market chain, philanthropist

Politics and government

 John Deutch, former Director of Central Intelligence
 Martin Feldstein, former chairman of the Council of Economic Advisers
 Henry Kissinger, former Secretary of State
 Empress Masako, of Japan
 Mitt Romney, and his wife Ann Romney – former Governor of Massachusetts, 2012 Republican presidential candidate, Senator from Utah
 Dorothy Stoneman, activist, founder of YouthBuild USA

Arts and music

 Winslow Homer (1836–1910), painter
 Frederick Law Olmsted, landscape architect 
 Walter Piston, composer 
 Phil Wilson, jazz trombonist and arranger

Media

 Sebastian Junger (born 1962), author, journalist, documentary filmmaker
 David E. Kelley, TV producer and writer
 Leo Monahan (1926–2013), American sports journalist
 Addison Powell, actor
 Jean Rogers, actress

Sports

 Emily Cook, American freestyle skier
 William Chandler Haskins, competed in the 1936 Summer Olympics
 Maxie Long, gold medalist in athletics at 1900 Olympic Games
 Paul Mara, New York Rangers defenseman 
 Becca Pizzi, American marathon runner
 Patrick Rissmiller, New York Rangers hockey forward 
 Patty Shea, Olympian in field hockey
 Wilbur Wood, Major League pitcher–Boston Red Sox, Pittsburgh Pirates, and Chicago White Sox

Literature

 Gerald Warner Brace, author and educator 
 Leah Hager Cohen, author
 William Dean Howells, author
 Talene Monahon, playwright/actress 
 Tom Perrotta, author

Academics

 Bernard Bailyn (1922-2020), American historian and professor  
 William P. Alford (born 1948), American professor and legal scholar 
 VA Shiva Ayyadurai (born 1963), MIT systems scientist and entrepreneur
 Vannevar Bush (1890–1974), MIT Dean of Engineering, helped create the National Science Foundation
 Clayton M. Christensen, Harvard Business School professor and author 
 Thomas Vose Daily, Roman Catholic bishop
 Bernard Davis (1916–1994), biologist, lived and died in Belmont 
 Wolfgang Ketterle, MIT physics professor (Nobel Prize in Physics, 2001)
 Richard Marius, reformationist scholar and novelist 
 Franco Modigliani, MIT economics professor (Nobel Memorial Prize in Economics, 1985)
 Edwin O. Reischauer, Harvard professor, East Asia scholar, and Ambassador to Japan
 Paul A. Samuelson, MIT economics professor (Nobel Memorial Prize in Economics, 1970)
 Dirk Jan Struik, HUAC victim and MIT mathematician 
 Steven C. Wheelwright, Harvard Business School professor and president of BYU-Hawaii 
 Fred Lawrence Whipple, astronomer 
 Norbert Wiener, mathematician 
 Robert Burns Woodward, organic chemist (Nobel Prize in Chemistry, 1965)

See also
 Belmont Public Library (Massachusetts)
 People from Belmont, Massachusetts

References

Further reading
 Somerville, Arlington and Belmont Directory. 1869; 1873; 1876.

External links

 Town of Belmont official website
 Town of Belmont / Mass.gov

 
Towns in Middlesex County, Massachusetts
Towns in Massachusetts